Wallonia is the predominantly French-speaking southern region of Belgium.

Wallonia may also refer to:

 Wallonia, Kentucky
 An administrative region created under Flamenpolitik in 1917 by the occupying German forces
 Romance Belgium, a subdivision of Belgium in dialectology